Justice T. K. Tukol (5 May 1918 – 18 August 1983) was known for his scholarly work on Jainism, education and judiciary. He was the judge of High court of Mysore. He headed the Mysore pay commission (1966–68). He also served as the vice-chancellor of the Bangalore University. His contribution to judiciary and books on Jainism (Compendium of Jainism, Sallekhana is not suicide, Jain Achar (Kannada), Yoga, Meditation and Mysticism in Jainism, Translation of Saman Suttam (English) and various publications) are remarkable.

Tukol was born in Gudur village of Hungund Taluka, Bagalkote district. He was a student of Karnatak College Dharwar and Fergusson College, Pune.

See also
 Index of Jainism-related articles

References

Scholars of Jainism
Academic staff of Bangalore University
1918 births
1983 deaths
20th-century Indian Jain writers
People from Bagalkot district
Judges of the Karnataka High Court
20th-century Indian judges